Yu Yunyao (born May 1941) is a Chinese politician who served as executive vice president of the Central Party School of the Chinese Communist Party from 2002 to 2006. He was a member of the 16th Central Committee of the Chinese Communist Party. He was a member of the Standing Committee of the 9th National People's Congress and  a delegate to the 11th National People's Congress.

Biography
Yu was born in Danyang County (now Danyang), Jiangsu, in May 1941. He graduated from Tsinghua University and Harbin Military Academy of Engineering. 

He joined the Chinese Communist Party (CCP) in December 1961. He worked in the Second Ministry of Machine Building for a long time, from 1964 to 1980. He was assigned to the Organization Department of the Chinese Communist Party in June 1980. He moved up the ranks to become deputy head in November 1994. He was despatched to the Central Party School of the Chinese Communist Party in July 2001, becoming vice president in July 2001 and executive vice president in March 2002. In March 2008, he took office as vice chairperson of the National People's Congress Overseas Chinese Affairs Committee, a position at ministerial level.

Publications

References

1941 births
Living people
People from Zhenjiang
Tsinghua University alumni
National University of Defense Technology alumni
People's Republic of China politicians from Jiangsu
Chinese Communist Party politicians from Jiangsu
Members of the 16th Central Committee of the Chinese Communist Party
Members of the Standing Committee of the 9th National People's Congress
Delegates to the 11th National People's Congress